The Cincinnati Stars were a Major League Baseball team that played in the National League for the 1880 season and were managed by John Clapp. The club finished their only season in 8th place with a record of 21–59. 

Following the 1880 campaign, the Stars were dropped from the NL after ownership refused to sign a league pledge that banned alcohol in league parks. The pledge also forbade clubs from renting their parks out on Sundays. Ownership begrudgingly did not contest the legality of their expulsion and the Stars were replaced with the Detroit Wolverines. Major League Baseball returned to Cincinnati in 1882 when the modern Reds were introduced.

Year-by-year records

Baseball Hall of Famers

References
Cincinnati Daily Star. December 4, 1879. Page 1.
Cincinnati Daily Star. December 23, 1879. Page 8.
Cincinnati Enquirer. December 4, 1879. Page 2.

External links
Team index page at Retrosheet.org

1880 establishments in Ohio
Sports teams in Cincinnati
Defunct Major League Baseball teams
Baseball teams established in 1880
1880 disestablishments in Ohio
Baseball teams disestablished in 1880
Defunct baseball teams in Ohio